The Brandon Valley School District is a public school district in Minnehaha County, based in Brandon, South Dakota. It serves the communities of Brandon and the nearby town of Valley Springs.

History
Brandon Elementary School was the start of the district in 1916. Additions were made in the 1930s and in 1987. In 2003, Robert Bennis Elementary School opened to serve students in the southern half of Brandon. Fred Assam Elementary opened in 2009 to relieve pressure on the two elementary Schools in Brandon. Valley Springs Community School consolidated with Brandon in the 1960s. The school is now used as an elementary school for Valley Springs, Manley, Minnesota and the surrounding eastern half of the district.

Schools

The Brandon Valley School District has five elementary schools, one intermediate school, one middle school, and one high school.

Elementary schools
Brandon Elementary School
Fred Assam Elementary School
Robert Bennis Elementary School
Valley Springs Elementary School
Inspiration Elementary School

Notable Graduates

Dale Moss – former football player and contestant on the 16th season of The Bachelorette.
Cody Jamison Strand - Broadway actor

References

External links

School districts in South Dakota
Education in Minnehaha County, South Dakota
Brandon, South Dakota
1916 establishments in South Dakota
School districts established in 1916